The 2012 Yokohama FC season sees Yokohama FC compete in J.League Division 2 for the fifth consecutive season. Yokohama FC are also competing in the 2012 Emperor's Cup.

Players

Competitions

J. League

League table

Matches

Promotion playoffs

Emperor's Cup

References

Yokohama FC
Yokohama FC seasons